Jean-Matthieu Descamps (born 12 February 1983) is a French former footballer who played as a striker. He played at the professional level with hometown club Montpellier. He also had two stints in Spain with Málaga in the 2004–05 La Liga season and with Racing de Ferrol in the Tercera División in 2006.

References

External links
 
 
 

1983 births
Living people
Association football forwards
French footballers
French expatriate footballers
French expatriate sportspeople in Spain
Expatriate footballers in Spain
Montpellier HSC players
Málaga CF players
FC Sète 34 players
Racing de Ferrol footballers
FC Libourne players
Jura Sud Foot players
FC Martigues players
Grenoble Foot 38 players